This article is about the particular significance of the decade 1810 - 1819 to Wales and its people.

Incumbents
Prince of Wales - George (later George IV)
Princess of Wales - Caroline of Brunswick

Events
1810
1811
1812
1813
1814
1815
1816
1817
1818
1819

Arts and literature

New books
Thomas Charles - Biblical Dictionary, vol. 4 (1811)
Dafydd Ddu Eryri -  (1810)
Richard Fenton 
A Tour in Quest of Genealogy (1811)
Memoirs of an Old Wig (1815)
Joseph Harris (Gomer) -  (1816)
Ann Hatton 
Cambrian Pictures (1810)
Chronicles of an Illustrious House (1816)
Samuel Johnson - A Diary of a Journey Into North Wales, in the Year 1774 (1816)
Thomas Jones (Dinbych) -  (1813)
William Owen Pughe -  (translation of Milton's Paradise Lost) (1819)
David Richards (Dafydd Ionawr) -  (1815)
John Thomas (Eos Gwynedd) -  (1817)

Music
1811
John James - 
1817 
Robert Williams -  (hymn tune, formerly named Bethel); Williams recorded that the tune was composed on 14 July of this year.

Births
1810
12 January - John Dillwyn Llewelyn, botanist and pioneer photographer (d. 1882)
15 January - John Evan Thomas, sculptor (d. 1873)
19 January - John Jones (Talhaiarn), poet and architect (d. 1869)
24 January - Thomas Jones, missionary (d. 1849)
1811
14 January - Rowland Prichard, musician (d. 1887)
26 January - Roger Edwards, minister (d. 1886)
11 March - Thomas Jones (Glan Alun), poet (d. 1866)
11 July - William Robert Grove, inventor (d. 1896)
date unknown - John Williams (Ab Ithel), antiquary (d. 1862)
1812
6 January - Catherine Glynne, future wife of William Ewart Gladstone (d. 1900)
3 February - Robert Elis (Cynddelw), poet and lexicographer (d. 1875)
3 April - Henry Richard, pacifist politician (d. 1888)
19 May - Lady Charlotte Guest, translator and philanthropist (d. 1895)
1813
30 June - Thomas Briscoe, translator (d. 1895)
1 August - William Ambrose (Emrys), poet (d. 1873)
10 October - William Adams, mining engineer (d. 1886)
date unknown - John Edwards (Meiriadog), poet (d. 1906)
1814
5 March - Joseph Edwards, sculptor (d. 1882)
date unknown - Eliezer Pugh, philanthropist (d. 1903)
1815
24 January - Thomas Gee, publisher (d. 1898)
16 April - Henry Austin Bruce, 1st Baron Aberdare (d. 1895)
May - William Lucas Collins, author (d. 1887)
21 November - John Bowen, Bishop of Sierra Leone (d. 1859)
13 December - Thomas Rees, Congregational minister (d. 1885)
1816
3 June - John Ormsby-Gore, 1st Baron Harlech, politician (d. 1876)
11 June - Thomas William Davids, ecclesiastical historian (d. 1884)
16 August - Charles John Vaughan, dean of Llandaff and co-founder of University of Wales, Cardiff
date unknown
Huw Derfel, poet and historian (d. 1890)
Edward Edwards (Pencerdd Ceredigion), musician (d. 1897)
Henry Robertson, Scots engineer responsible for building the North Wales Mineral Railway (d. 1888)
1817
16 August - Rowland Williams, theologian and academic
1 November - Henry Brinley Richards, composer (d. 1885)
1818
11 January - Daniel Silvan Evans, lexicographer (d. 1903)
18 December - David Davies (Llandinam), industrialist and philanthropist (d. 1890)
1819
4 November - Arthur Hill-Trevor, 1st Baron Trevor (d. 1894)
15 November - Arthur Wynn Williams, physician (d. 1886)

Deaths
1810
3 April - Thomas Edwards (Twm o'r Nant), poet and dramatist (b. 1739)
27 June - Richard Crawshay, industrialist (b. 1729)
1811
25 September - Joshua Eddowes, printer and bookseller (b. 1724)
1812
13 March - Henry Bayly Paget, 1st Earl of Uxbridge (b. 1744)
1813
23 March - Princess Augusta, daughter of Frederick, Prince of Wales and mother of Caroline, the Princess of Wales (b. 1737)
17 April - Thomas Edwards (Yr Hwntw Mawr), murderer
date unknown - Jane Cave, poet (b. 1754)
1814
12 March - Evan Thomas (Ieuan Fardd Ddu), printer and translator (b. 1733)
21 June - Sir Erasmus Gower, colonial governor (b. 1742)
5 October - Thomas Charles of Bala, Welsh Bible pioneer (b. 1755)
1815
1816
29 June - David Williams, Enlightenment philosopher (b. 1738) 
1817
16 January - General Vaughan Lloyd, commander of the Woolwich Arsenal (b. 1736)
27 March - Josiah Boydell, artist (b. 1752)
17 July - William Williams of Llandygly (b. 1738)
31 July - Benjamin Hall, industrialist (b. 1778)
date unknown - David Hughes, Principal of Jesus College, Oxford
1818
12 September - John Thomas (Eos Gwynedd), poet (b. 1742)
1819
31 January - Thomas Bevan, missionary (b.c.1796)
8 February - Sydenham Teak Edwards, botanist (b. 1768)
25 June - John Abel, minister (b. 1770)
6 November - Princess Charlotte Augusta of Wales, daughter of the Prince and Princess of Wales (b. 1796)

 
19th century in Wales
Wales
Wales
Decades in Wales